"Bless You" is a song released in 1961 by Tony Orlando. The song was written by Barry Mann and Cynthia Weil.

Chart performance
The song spent 12 weeks on the Billboard Hot 100 chart, peaking at No. 15, while reaching No. 5 on the UK's Record Retailer chart, and No. 5 on Canada's CHUM Hit Parade.

Year-end lists
The song was ranked No. 73 on Billboards end of year "Hot 100 for 1961 - Top Sides of the Year".

Cover versions
Mann released a version of the song himself in 1962, as the flipside of "Teenage Has-Been".

References

1961 songs
1961 singles
Tony Orlando songs
Epic Records singles
Songs written by Barry Mann
Songs with lyrics by Cynthia Weil
Song recordings produced by Don Kirshner